Lindsay Thomas may refer to:

 Lindsay Thomas (politician) (born 1943), American politician and businessman
 Lindsay Thomas (actress) (1978–2010), Canadian stage actress
 Lindsay Thomas (footballer, born 1988), Australian rules footballer for North Melbourne and Port Adelaide
 Lindsay Thomas (footballer, born 1955), Australian rules footballer for St Kilda